Canton-Potsdam Hospital is a 94-bed 
not-for-profit hospital located in Potsdam, New York, which is northeast of Canton the county seat of St. Lawrence. Their special services programs include
inpatient detox and Center for Cancer Care.

History
"The Canton-Potsdam Hospital Foundation was established in 1985" to help enlarge the existing hospital. Exapnsion included a $35 million building, erected in 2017, and a $6 million structure in 2018. Part of Canton-Potsdam's growth came from affiliations with other hospitals.

St. Lawrence Health System
In 2013 Canton-Potsdam began a state-approved contractual arrangement to manage E.J. Noble Hospital, another New York hospital. The combination, which also brought recognition from union picketers, was named St. Lawrence Health System. This "new two-hospital system" subsequently expanded by adding Massena Memorial Hospital in 2019.

E.J. Noble Hospital
"E.J. Noble Hospital opened its doors in 1952."

References

  

Hospitals in New York (state)